Jack the Ripper was a French alternative rock band active between 1995 and 2008. The name is inspired by the song of the same name of Nick Cave and the Bad Seeds.

Band members 

 Arnaud Mazurel: lead vocals.
 Alexandre Irissou: Piano, keyboards and Melodica.
 Hervé Mazurel: guitars.
 Dominique Martin: electric guitar and piano.
 Thierry Mazurel: bass.
 Fabrice Fenaux: drums
 Adrien Rodrigue: violin.
 Aka de Kebnekaize: trumpet.

Discography 

 The Book of Lies (2000, self-released)
 I'm Coming (2003, Le Village Vert)
 Ladies First (2005, Le Village Vert and Wagram Music)

References

External links 
 Official website (French)
 Myspace page

French alternative rock groups
Musical groups from Paris